The Amadeus Basin is a large (~170,000 km2) intracratonic sedimentary basin in central Australia, lying mostly within the southern Northern Territory, but extending into the state of Western Australia.

Origins 
The Amadeus Basin is named after Lake Amadeus which lies within the basin. Local deposition of up to 14 km of marine and non-marine sedimentary rocks took place from the Neoproterozoic to the late Paleozoic.

Along with other nearby sedimentary basins of similar age (Officer Basin, Georgina Basin, Ngalia Basin), the Amadeus Basin is believed to have once been part of the hypothetical Centralian Superbasin.

The basin was locally deformed during the Petermann Orogeny (late Neoproterozoic — Cambrian), and more extensively during the Paleozoic Alice Springs Orogeny, events that fragmented the former Centralian Superbasin.

The basin has been above water for the past 50 million years, as the modern coast of South Australia and Western Australia formed during this time.

Resources
The Amadeus Basin contains the producing Mereenie Oil Field near Kings Canyon and Palm Valley Gas Field near Hermannsburg, which supply most of the energy resources to the Northern Territory.

Most of the gas flows along the Amadeus Gas Pipeline to Darwin, while the oil is pumped to Alice Springs and then transported to Adelaide for refining.

See also

Alice Springs Orogeny
Georgina Basin
Ngalia Basin
Officer Basin
Uluru (Ayers Rock), situated within the Amadeus Basin

References

Wells AT, Forman DJ, Ranford LC, Cook PJ (1970) Geology of the Amadeus Basin, Central Australia. Bureau of Mineral Resources, Australia, Bulletin 100.
Lindsay JF, Korsch RJ (1991) The evolution of the Amadeus Basin, central Australia. In Korsch RJ, & Kennard JM (Editors). Geological and geophysical studies in the Amadeus Basin, central Australia. Bureau of Mineral Resources, Australia, Bulletin 236, 7-32.
Shaw RD (1991) The tectonic development of the Amadeus Basin, central Australia. In Korsch RJ, & Kennard JM (Editors). Geological and geophysical studies in the Amadeus Basin, central Australia. Bureau of Mineral Resources, Australia, Bulletin 236, 429–462.

External links
 Amadeus Basin at Geoscience Australia 
Amadeus Basin at Northern Territory Geological Survey

Geology of Western Australia
Geology of the Northern Territory
Sedimentary basins of Australia
Oil fields of Australia
Energy in the Northern Territory
Natural gas in Western Australia